Alamut-e Sharqi District, meaning "East Alamut District", formerly Rudbar-e Alamut District, is a district (bakhsh) in Qazvin County, Qazvin Province, Iran. At the 2006 census, its population was 12,519, in 4,128 families.  The District has one city: Moallem Kalayeh.  The District has three rural districts (dehestan): Alamut-e Bala Rural District, Alamut-e Pain Rural District, and Moallem Kalayeh Rural District. The majority of people in the district are Tats who speak a dialect of the Tati language. A minority of Azerbaijani people also live in this part.

See also 

 Dineh Kuh

References 

Districts of Qazvin Province
Qazvin County